The 2018–19 FA WSL was the eighth edition of the FA Women's Super League (WSL) since it was formed in 2010. It was the first season after a rebranding of the four highest levels in English women's football. The previous FA WSL 2 became the Championship – eleven clubs competed in the 2018–19 FA Women's Championship.

Arsenal won their first WSL since 2012 with a 4–0 victory over Brighton & Hove Albion.

Teams
Following restructuring of the women's game in order to provide for a fully professional Women's Super League (WSL), membership of both the first and second tier is subject to a licence, based on a series of off-the-field criteria. Yeovil Town estimated the budget needed for a WSL season at about £350,000. Existing WSL teams were first offered the opportunity to bid for licences, with all applying FA WSL clubs retaining their place in the first tier, with Brighton & Hove Albion from the WSL2 also offered a place in the WSL. From the first tier, Sunderland were unsuccessful in their license application.

This left up to two places in the WSL and up to five places in the Championship for applying clubs. Fifteen applications were received for both the top two tiers, and West Ham  were given a licence in the second stage, so that the league is made up of 11 teams.

Managerial changes

League table

Results

Position by round

Season statistics

Top scorers

Top assists

Awards

Monthly awards

Annual awards

See also
2018–19 FA WSL Cup
2018–19 FA Women's Championship (tier 2)
2018–19 FA Women's National League (tier 3 & 4)

References

External links
Official website

Women's Super League seasons
1
2018–19 domestic women's association football leagues